Nu Mine (also known as NuMine) is an unincorporated community in Cowanshannock Township, Armstrong County, Pennsylvania, United States. Nu Mine has a post office, with ZIP code 16244.

History
Nu Mine was one of 17 company towns sold in 1947: McIntyre, Coal Run, Iselin, Waterman, Lucernemines, Aultman, Ernest, Tidesdale, Coy, Luciusboro, Fulton Run, Nu Mine, Yatesboro, Margaret, Helvetia, Twin Rocks, and Yatesboro Lots.

References

Unincorporated communities in Armstrong County, Pennsylvania
Unincorporated communities in Pennsylvania